The 2004 National AFL Under 18 Championships was the ninth edition of the AFL Under 18 Championships. Eight teams competed in the championships: Vic Metro, Vic Country, South Australia and Western Australia in Division 1, and New South Wales/Australian Capital Territory (NSW/ACT), Northern Territory, Queensland and Tasmania in Division 2. The competition was played over three rounds across two divisions. Vic Metro and the Northern Territory were the Division 1 and Division 2 champions, respectively. The Michael Larke Medal (for the best player in Division 1) was awarded to Victoria Metro's Jesse W. Smith, and the Hunter Harrison Medal (for the best player in Division 2) was won by the Northern Territory's Richard Tambling.

Results

Division 1

Division 1 Ladder

Division 2

Division 2 Ladder

Under 18 All-Australian team
The 2004 Under 18 All-Australian team was named on 11 July 2004:

New South Wales/Australian Capital Territory: Edward Clarke
Northern Territory: Richard Tambling
Queensland: Will Hamill
South Australia: Ben Eckermann, Ryan Griffen, Heath Grundy, Scott McMahon, Angus Monfries, Cameron Wood
Tasmania: Justin Sherman
Victoria Country: Brett Deledio, Marcus Drum, Ruory Kirkby, Jordan Lewis, Dean Polo
Victoria Metropolitan: Jayden Attard, Jarred Moore, Ben Sharp, Jesse W. Smith
Western Australia: Mark Le Cras, Mitchell Morton, Alan Toovey

References

Under 18